Garage Graphix was an Australian community group of women artists, active between 1981 and 1998.

History 
Based in Mount Druitt, Sydney, Garage Graphix was a community group of women artists committed to creating a space for members to freely express their cultural heritage and identity. Created in the garage of an opera singer, it was established by Blacktown Council. A screen printing workshop and design space, the "Garage" produced political and affirmative action posters during the 1980s related to Indigenous Land Rights, Indigenous Women's rights, and other women's rights issues. Garage Graphix exhibited along with Redback Graphix at University Fine Arts Gallery in 1988 in an exhibition titled Shocking Diversity.

The "Garage" operated on the principle that "the people of Western Sydney have the right to play an active role in the way their culture develops". Facilities provided included a photocopier, photographic darkroom, process camera, layout and design area, screen printing workshop, and t-shirt printing "jig".

Further reading 

 Significance Assessment: Garage Graphix Community Art Workshop Poster Archive, 2021

 The National Gallery of Australia holds over 50 prints by Garage Graphix in their collection including Dispossessed, a poster by Alice Hinton-Bateup,  Kamilaroi/Wonnarua peoples.

References 

Australian artist groups and collectives
Australian artists